Eddie Wohl is an American composer, music producer, and mixing engineer.

As an artist, he was signed to Epic, Elektra and Mercury/Island, and had a production deal with Roadrunner Records. Growing up on the East Coast, Wohl was in his first band at age 15 and signed his first record deal at the age of 25. Wohl's major influences growing up included Black Sabbath, Stevie Wonder, Public Enemy and McCoy Tyner. Coming out of the New York City club/band scene, he has spent many years as a songwriter and producer. In 1999, Wohl, along with his partners, launched the New York-based Scrap 60 Productions, which was responsible for producing acts such as Anthrax, Ill Nino and H2O, among others.

Wohl's producing credits include a variety of acts, from metal Fuel, Anthrax, and Smile Empty Soul, to glam-punker Jesse Mallin and pop artist/American Idol judge Kara Dioguardi. He has produced records featuring performances by Bruce Springsteen, Robby Krieger, Roger Daltrey, Chino Moreno, Jakob Dylan, Josh Homme, Chris Shiflett, Jada Pinkett Smith, and Dimebag Darrell.

As a composer, Wohl has received six Emmy Awards. Some TV appearances of his music include Super Bowl XLVII, The CBS Super Bowl Pre-Game show, "CBS Super Bowl 50th Anniversary" spots the NFL on CBS, NBA on NBC, The Rio Olympics, The NHL, NCAA Basketball, PGA Golf on CBS, Young Sheldon, and The Late Late Show with Craig Ferguson.

Discography

Mixing credits

2015 

 Reign of Terror - Terror Universal

Production credits

2016 
 Shapeshifter - Smile Empty Soul

2014 
 Food Chain - Sean Danielsen
 Puppet Strings - Fuel
 Till Death, La Familia - Ill Nino

2013 
 Chemicals - Smile Empty Soul
 Enjoy the Process - Sean Danielsen

2012 
 3's - Smile Empty Soul
 Spreading My Wings - World Fire Brigade

2009 
 Consciousness - Smile Empty Soul

2008 
 Enigma - Ill Niño

2007 
 Glitter in the Gutter- Jesse Malin

2006 
 The Best of Ill Niño - Ill Niño
 Of Vengeance and Violence - Dry Kill Logic

2005 
 One Nation Underground - Ill Niño

2002 
 All We Want - H2O
 Bitterness the Star - 36 Crazyfists

2001 
 (The) New Release - Primer 55

2000 
 Introduction To Mayhem - Primer 55

References 

American rock keyboardists
Year of birth missing (living people)
Living people
American record producers